Cecilia Keaveney (born 27 November 1968) is a former Irish Fianna Fáil politician. She was a Teachta Dála (TD) and a Senator from 1996 to 2011.

Early life
She was born in Derry, Northern Ireland. She was educated at Carndonagh Community School in the Inishowen peninsula, County Donegal, in Ireland and then at the University of Ulster at Jordanstown, Northern Ireland. She is a former music teacher.

Her father Paddy Keaveney was an Independent Fianna Fáil Teachta Dála (TD) for Donegal North-East from 1976 to 1977. She was co-opted to Donegal County Council in 1995 following his death.

Political career
Keaveney was first elected to Dáil Éireann for Donegal North-East in a by-election on 2 April 1996 following the death of Independent Fianna Fáil TD Neil Blaney. She was re-elected at the 1997 general election and 2002 general election but lost her seat at the 2007 general election.

Keaveney was formerly Chair of the Joint Oireachtas Committee on Arts, Sports, Tourism, Community, Rural and Gaeltacht Affairs.

Keaveney lost her seat in a tough 2007 election battle where all three outgoing TDs were Fianna Fáil members. Under the Single transferable vote proportional representation electoral system used in Ireland, it was virtually impossible for all three to be elected. This unusual situation arose when in July 2006 outgoing Fianna Fáil TD Jim McDaid reversed his earlier announcement that he would not seek a nomination to contest the election. In the intervening period Independent Fianna Fáil and its sole TD Niall Blaney had been absorbed into Fianna Fáil. As a result, Joe McHugh of Fine Gael won a seat at her expense.

Keaveney stood successfully for election to Seanad Éireann on the Cultural and Educational Panel at the 2007 election.

She did not contest the 2011 Seanad election.

See also
Families in the Oireachtas

References

 

1968 births
Living people
Alumni of Ulster University
Fianna Fáil TDs
Fianna Fáil senators
Irish schoolteachers
Local councillors in County Donegal
Members of the 23rd Seanad
21st-century women members of Seanad Éireann
Members of the 27th Dáil
Members of the 28th Dáil
Members of the 29th Dáil
20th-century women Teachtaí Dála
21st-century women Teachtaí Dála
Politicians from County Donegal